Viktor Zsitva (born July 14, 1939) is a former Hungarian ice hockey player. He played for the Hungary men's national ice hockey team at the 1964 Winter Olympics in Innsbruck.

References

1939 births
Living people
Hungarian ice hockey forwards
Ice hockey players at the 1964 Winter Olympics
Olympic ice hockey players of Hungary
Ice hockey people from Budapest
Újpesti TE (ice hockey) players